Andarmullipallam is a revenue village in Cuddalore district, state of Tamil Nadu, India.

External links 
 Government of Tamil Nadu

References 

Villages in Cuddalore district
Cities and villages in Cuddalore taluk